Wolfgang Behrendt (born 14 June 1936) was a bantamweight amateur boxer from East Germany, won the gold medal at the 1956 Summer Olympics for the United Team of Germany. He subsequently became the first Olympic champion for East Germany. He was born in Berlin.

Amateur career
He won the gold medal at the 1956 Summer Olympics and became the first Olympic champion for East Germany.

Amateur highlights
Record: 188 Wins – 8 Losses – 5 Draws
1955 East German Bantamweight Champion, 3rd place (Flyweight) at European Championships in Berlin.
1956 Gold Medalist (Bantamweight) in a unified German team at the 1956 Olympics in Melbourne. Results were:
Defeated Henrik Ottesen (Denmark) KO-2
Defeated Owen Reilly (Great Britain) PTS
Defeated Freddie Gilroy (Ireland) PTS
Defeated Song Soon-Chun (South Korea) PTS
1957 East German Bantamweight Champion
1960 East German Featherweight Champion

References

1936 births
Living people
Olympic boxers of the United Team of Germany
Bantamweight boxers
Olympic gold medalists for the United Team of Germany
Boxers at the 1956 Summer Olympics
Boxers from Berlin
Olympic medalists in boxing
Recipients of the Patriotic Order of Merit in bronze
Recipients of the Banner of Labor
German male boxers
Medalists at the 1956 Summer Olympics